Scaevola calendulacea commonly known as  dune fan-flower, is a flowering plant in the family Goodeniaceae. It is a  small, mat-forming shrub with blue fan-shaped flowers with a yellow centre and grows on sand dunes in eastern and southern Australia.

Description 

Taxonomy and naming
Scaevola calendulacea was first formally described in 1798 by Henry Cranke Andrews as Goodenia calendulacea, but in 1917 was assigned to the genus, Scaevola, by George Claridge Druce.The specific epithet (calendulacea) refers to the similarity to the genus Calendula.

Distribution and habitat
This scaevola is a widespread species growing on sand dunes in coastal locations  in South Australia, Queensland, New South Wales and Victoria.

References

calendulacea
Flora of New South Wales
Flora of Victoria (Australia)
Flora of Queensland
Flora of South Australia
Asterales of Australia
Plants described in 1798
Taxa named by George Claridge Druce
Taxa named by Henry Cranke Andrews